Padaharella Ammayi is a 1986 Telugu-language comedy film, produced by R. Dasaradha Rami Reddyunder the Sri Sailaja Films banner and directed by P. S. Krishna Mohan Reddy. It stars Rajendra Prasad and Chitra, with music composed by Sivaji Raja.

Plot
Chanti (Rajendra Prasad) a young bachelor shows averse towards marriage perceiving conflicts of various couples. Since he is compelled by elders, is under dichotomy. During that bind, his friend Babu Rao (Nutan Prasad) enlightens him to select sixteen years immature girl. Ultimately, his hunt ends when he finds a callow beauty Papai (Chitra) whom he wedlock and starts a delightful life. However, Chanti always counterfeits his wife and conceits that he has very close intimacy with the film industry. Amazingly, all of them, appear before him and reply as his dear which throws him into chaos. Later, Rekha (Jayalalitha) friend of Papai divulges it as her play to prove Chanti as a hoaxer. Anyhow, Papai still strongly believes rectitude of Chanti and fondness towards her. Accordingly, she challenges Rekha and makes another play to confirm it. Dismally, it misfires and makes Chanti suspect Papai's chastity. Therein, Chanti quits her and she attempts suicide. But in time, Chanti realizes the actuality and rescues Papai. Finally, the movie ends on a happy note with the reunion of the couple.

Cast 
Rajendra Prasad as Chanti
Chitra as Papai
Suthi Veerabhadra Rao as Trilokadhipati
Nutan Prasad as Babu Rao
Dasari Narayana Rao as himself
S. P. Balasubrahmanyam as himself
Raavi Kondala Rao
Kakarala
Radha Kumari
Jayalalita as Rekha 
Mamatha
Chandana
Jayamalini as herself
Baby Seeta

Crew
Art: Thota Yaadu
Choreography: John Babu, Kumari
Fights: Horseman Babu
Dialogues:  Madhu
Lyrics: Veturi, Acharya Aatreya, Sirivennela Sitarama Sastry 
Playback: S. P. Balasubrahmanyam, P. Susheela, K. J. Yesudas, Vani Jayaram
Music: Sivaji Raja
Story: Vasundhara
Editing: K. Ramgopal Reddy
Cinematography: Divakar
Producer: R. Dasaradha Rami Reddy
Screenplay - Director: P. S. Krishna Mohan Reddy
Banner: Sri Sailaja Films
Release Date: 2 October 1986

Soundtrack

Music composed by Sivaji Raja was released through MGS Audio Company. Lyrics were written by Veturi, Acharya Aatreya and Sirivennela Seetharama Sastry.

References

1980s Telugu-language films
1986 comedy films
1986 films